Events from the year 2013 in Macau, China.

Incumbents
 Chief Executive - Fernando Chui
 President of the Legislative Assembly - Lau Cheok Va, Ho Iat Seng

Events

October
 17–20 October - Men's Macau Open 2013.

November
 26 November - Start of 2013 Macau Open Grand Prix Gold at Macau Forum.

December
 1 December - End of 2013 Macau Open Grand Prix Gold at Macau Forum.

References

 
Years of the 21st century in Macau
Macau
Macau
2010s in Macau